Charles Thomas Suhr (9 July 1885 – 6 May 1930) was an Australian rules footballer who played with Melbourne and St Kilda in the Victorian Football League (VFL).

Notes

External links 

1885 births
1930 deaths
Australian rules footballers from Victoria (Australia)
Melbourne Football Club players
St Kilda Football Club players